Marc
Henry C. Thias House, also known as the Forrest Swarz Residence, currently the Marc and Christina Houseman Residence, is a historic home located at Washington, Franklin County, Missouri. It was built in 1888, and is a two-story, Queen Anne brick dwelling.  It features multiple porches with decorative spindlework.

It was listed on the National Register of Historic Places in 1984.

References

Houses on the National Register of Historic Places in Missouri
Queen Anne architecture in Missouri
Houses completed in 1888
Buildings and structures in Franklin County, Missouri
National Register of Historic Places in Franklin County, Missouri